Juicio Final (1979) (Spanish for "Final Judgement" 1979) was a professional wrestling supercard show, scripted and produced by Consejo Mundial de Lucha Libre (CMLL), which took place on December 7, 1979, in Arena México, Mexico City, Mexico. The show served as the year-end finale for CMLL before Arena México, CMLL's main venue, closed down for the winter for renovations and to host Circo Atayde. The shows replaced the regular Super Viernes ("Super Friday") shows held by CMLL since the mid-1930s.

The main event of the show was a tag team Lucha de Apuestas, or "bet match", where the losing team would be shaved bald as a result. The match saw the team of El Faraón and Águila India defeat Sangre Chicana and Tony Salazar. Afterwards Chicana and Salazar had to submit to having their hair shaved off by the official EMLL barber. In the semi-main event NWA World Light Heavyweight Champion Alfonso Dantés successfully defended the title against UWA World Light Heavyweight Champion Gran Hamada in a match where the UWA championship was not on the line in the match. On the undercard El Satánico defeated Ringo Mendoza to retain the Mexican National Middleweight Championship.

Production

Background
For decades Arena México, the main venue of the Mexican professional wrestling promotion Consejo Mundial de Lucha Libre (CMLL), would close down in early December and remain closed into either January or February to allow for renovations as well as letting Circo Atayde occupy the space over the holidays. As a result, CMLL usually held a "end of the year" supercard show on the first or second Friday of December in lieu of their normal Super Viernes show. 1955 was the first year where CMLL used the name "El Juicio Final" ("The Final Judgement") for their year-end supershow. It is no longer an annually recurring show, but instead held intermittently sometimes several years apart and not always in the same month of the year either. All Juicio Final shows have been held in Arena México in Mexico City, Mexico which is CMLL's main venue, its "home".

Storylines
The 1979 Juicio Final show featured sixprofessional wrestling matches scripted by CMLL with some wrestlers involved in scripted feuds. The wrestlers portray either heels (referred to as rudos in Mexico, those that play the part of the "bad guys") or faces (técnicos in Mexico, the "good guy" characters) as they perform.

Results

References

1979 in Mexico
1979 in professional wrestling
CMLL Juicio Final
Events in Mexico City
December 1979 events in Mexico
1970s in Mexico City